Stukely Stafford Ellsworth, Sr., (September 26, 1769March 31, 1837) was an American politician from New York state.  He served two terms in the New York State Assembly, representing Otsego County, and later served in the New York State Senate.

Biography
Stukeley Ellsworth was born September 26, 1769, in West Greenwich, Rhode Island.  He was raised and lived most of his life in Otsego County, New York, living first at the town of Laurens, then Hartwick.

He was a justice of the peace and town supervisor before being elected to the New York State Assembly in 1817 and 1820.  He served in the 41st and 44th legislative sessions.  In 1824, he was elected to a four-year term in the New York State Senate.

He was injured in a stage coach accident during one of his trips to the Senate, and never fully recovered from the injury.  He died suddenly while chopping wood at his home on March 31, 1837.

Personal life and family
Stukeley Ellsworth was the 11th child of Judiah Aylworth, who served in the Rhode Island General Assembly in 1776.  Stukeley's mother was Judiah's second wife, Rosanna ( Edwards), she had previously been the widow of Stukeley Stafford, who became his namesake.

Judiah Aylworth was a grandson of Arthur Aylsworth, an English settler who emigrated to the Rhode Island Colony in 1681.

Stukeley Ellsworth married Mercy Harrington in 1795.  They had eight children.  Two of their sons also served in elected office—Waterman Ellsworth served in the New York State Assembly representing Chautauqua County in 1839, and Orlando Ellsworth served in the Wisconsin State Assembly, representing Milwaukee County in 1858.

Stukeley's grandson via his son Orlando was Eugene Stafford Ellsworth, the namesake of Ellsworth Community College in Iowa.

References

 

1769 births
1837 deaths
People from Kent County, Rhode Island
People from Hartwick, New York
New York (state) state senators
Members of the New York State Assembly
New York (state) Democratic-Republicans